A Girl Called Cerveza is the fifteenth studio album by the German thrash metal band Tankard released through Nuclear Blast Records, released on 27 July 2012.

Track listing

Personnel
Andreas "Gerre" Geremia - vocals
Andy Gutjahr - guitar
Frank Thorwarth - bass, backing vocals
Olaf Zissel - drums

References

2012 albums
Tankard (band) albums
Nuclear Blast albums